White Trash Christmas is the fifth and final Christmas album by Bob Rivers, released in 2002.

Track listing
 Aquaclaus - 2:47
Straight parody of "Aqualung" as performed by Jethro Tull, describing the less savory aspects of being a department-store Santa Claus.
 What If Eminem Did Jingle Bells? - 3:08
A hardcore hip-hop interpretation of James Lord Pierpont's classic winter carol.
 Osama Got Run Over by a Reindeer - 1:44
Straight parody of "Grandma Got Run Over by a Reindeer" as performed by Elmo Shropshire; the song describes reindeer attacking terror leader Osama bin Laden.
 White Trash Christmas - 2:46
Parody of "White Christmas," performed by hillbillies (in the official music video, the Willie Nelson band, with Mickey Raphael as one of the three wise men) as a down-tempo country music piece.
 Little Hooters Girl - 1:52
Parody of "The Little Drummer Boy," performed by an all-male, a cappella chorus: M-pact. Song describes, in crude terms, the assets of a waitress at a Hooters restaurant.
 Be Claus I Got High - 3:27
Straight parody of "Because I Got High" as performed by Afroman.
 Not So Silent Night - 1:55
Fast-tempo Hard Rock rendition
 Me and Mrs. Claus - 2:20
Straight parody of "Me and Mrs. Jones" as performed by Billy Paul.
 Have Yourself an Ozzy Little Christmas - 1:49
Parody of "Have Yourself a Merry Little Christmas," sung by Bob Rivers. The song makes references to Ozzy Osbourne's antics and his then-popular reality show The Osbournes.
 Merry Christmas Allah - 2:41
Straight parody of "Merry Christmas Darling" as performed by The Carpenters, with an Islamic twist.
 Shoppin' Around for a Christmas Tree - 1:51
Straight parody of "Rockin' Around the Christmas Tree" as performed by Brenda Lee.
 I'll Be Stoned for Christmas - 2:27
Parody of "I'll Be Home for Christmas" as performed by Dean Martin, in an exaggerated homage to Martin's act as a drunk.

Chart performance

References

Bob Rivers albums
2002 Christmas albums
Christmas albums by American artists
Rock Christmas albums